Tai Mo Shan is the highest peak in Hong Kong, with an elevation of . It is located at approximately the geographical centre of the New Territories.

The Tai Mo Shan Country Park covers an area of  around Tai Mo Shan. It is located to the north of Tai Lam Country Park. The  Long Falls is the highest waterfall in Hong Kong.

Geography
The whole Tai Mo Shan mountain range, known as Guan Fu Mountain (官富山, named after the salt field Kwun Fu Cheung (官富場) in present-day Kowloon Bay) in Ming and Qing dynasties, covers over 350 square km, and stretches from Tai Lam Chung Reservoir in the West near Tuen Mun and Ma On Shan in the east and the mountains of Kowloon and Clear Water Bay in the south. Two other significant coastal peaks, the Lantau Peak (934m) on Lantau Island and Mount Wutong in Shenzhen (943.7m) are approximately 27 km to the southwest and 21.5 km to the northeast respectively.

Subpeaks
There are a few subpeaks that are given names in the Tai Mo Shan area, including:

 Sze Fong Shan
 Wo Yang Shan
 Miu Ko Toi
 Wo Tong Kong lower - there is an upper summit historically logged on this page at 702 metres (2303 ft). It is approximately 1 km North East of the lower summit along the same ridge. However it is just a point on the ridge with virtually no prominence from the parent peak, Tai Mo Shan. The lower peak has enough prominence to be considered an independent summit, but this has not been verified by a surveyor.
Lin Fa Shan, Tsuen Wan 
Shek Lung Kung, Tsuen Wan 
Tin Fu Tsai Shan
Ha Fa Shan, Tsuen Wan

Geology
Tai Mo Shan is an inactive volcano dating from the Jurassic period. A small hill known as "Kwun Yam Shan" near the mountain still vents warm air through cracks in the rocks that lead all the way to the mantle. The holes that exhale warm air are known as "hot pots". When the surface temperature is cold, and the warmth of the expelled air is clearly discernible, this phenomenon is referred to by locals as "dragon's breath". If the air temperature at the summit is 6 degrees Celsius, then the air emerging from the interior of Kwun Yum Shan is somewhere between 13 and 21 degrees Celsius. These "hot pots" are remnants of the active volcano's superheated steam vents. The area's volcanic rocks are mainly coarse ash crystal tuff.

Climate
Under the Köppen climate classification, Tai Mo Shan features a humid subtropical climate (Cwa), bordering a subtropical highland climate (Cwb). Due to the height of the mountain, Tai Mo Shan is claimed to be Hong Kong's most misty area, as it is often covered in clouds. In summer it is frequently covered with cumulus clouds, especially on rainy days, and in winter stratus clouds and fog often cover the peak. It is not uncommon for temperatures to drop below freezing point during the winter. A record low of negative 6 Celsius was seen in the January 2016 East Asia cold wave.

Vegetation
In the past, Tai Mo Shan was famous for a type of green tea, called mist or cloud tea, which grew wild on the mountain side. Occasionally, local people can still be seen picking the tea shoots for brewing green tea.

More than 1,500 species of plants have been recorded in Tai Mo Shan including 27 species of native wild orchids, the protected Chinese Lily (Lilium brownii) which mostly grows on the east side of the Mountain, 24 species of native ferns, including tree ferns, of which a total of only 4 tree ferns species have been recorded around the entire mountain, 19 species of native grasses, and 7 species of native bamboos. Camellia sinensis var. waldenae (formerly Camellia waldenae) are also found on the mountain.

A few types of wild orchids also grow in the streams of Tai Mo Shan including the Chinese pholidota orchid, Hong Kong's most common orchid, and the bamboo orchid, so called because of a distinct stem that looks like bamboo, which also grows in the streams of Tai Mo Shan.

During the Japanese occupation of Hong Kong in World War II, most of the trees in the park were cut down and extensive reforestation was carried out after the war. Trees that were planted are mostly non-native such as Pinus massoniana, Acacia confusa, Lophostemon confertus, and paper bark tree. The area has now become one of Hong Kong's major forest plantations.

The south-east slopes of Tai Mo Shan are covered with patches of well developed montane forest. The area, covering 130 hectares, was designated as a Site of Special Scientific Interest in 1975.

Wildlife
Local wildlife consists of birds, snakes and butterflies. There are also freshwater crabs, feral dogs, feral cats, oxen, Porcupines and wild boar.

History
In 1986, a 34-hour blaze destroyed 282,500 trees at Shing Mun and Tai Mo Shan and ravaged 7.40 km² of countryside.

Tai Mo Shan Country Park was formally designated on the 23rd of February 1979.

Access
The summit of Tai Mo Shan is not accessible to visitors, as it is occupied by a Hong Kong Observatory (ex-RAF) weather radar station. It was reported in July 2014 that the station additionally houses facilities of the People's Liberation Army.

See also
 List of mountains, peaks and hills in Hong Kong
 Country parks and conservation in Hong Kong
 Kadoorie Farm and Botanic Garden

References

External links

 Tai Mo Shan Country Park

Mountains, peaks and hills of Hong Kong
Country parks and special areas of Hong Kong
Volcanism of Hong Kong
Jurassic volcanism
Extinct volcanoes